Roman Zentsov (born September 10, 1973 in Bryansk) is a retired Russian heavyweight mixed martial arts fighter who has competed in the PRIDE Fighting Championships, a major MMA organization based in Japan, and BodogFIGHT. Zentsov has an overall 18-12-0 record in mixed martial arts, and 2-1-0 record in boxing.

Mixed martial arts career
Zentsov is part of the Red Devil Sport Club (team) and has trained extensively with Fedor Emelianenko, PRIDE's Heavyweight champion since he joined the group in 2005. In 2007 Fedor began to also spar heavily with young heavyweight Kirill Sidelnikov, while Roman has trained in St. Petersburg primarily over the past couple years. Roman's head coach is a Muay Thai champion Ruslan Nagnibeda.

Personal life
Zensov hopes to unite all radical Russian right-wing organizations under the banner of one nationalist movement, mobilize the Russian nation on the basis of having external enemies, and to create a national-socialist state.  Through his organization, Soprotivlenie ("Resistance"), Zentsov has been known to promote sports as a means of fighting alcoholism, while at the same time being a means of recruiting individuals into right-wing nationalist organizations, such as Demunshkin's SS.

His upper left arm has a tattoo of the kanji words "宮本武蔵" (the samurai warrior Miyamoto Musashi).

Championships and Accomplishments
M-1 Global
M-1 MFC Heavyweight Championship (1 Time)
2000 M-1 MFC European Championship Tournament Runner up
2000 M-1 MFC World Championship Tournament Semifinalist
2 Hot 2 Handle
2H2H 3: Hotter Than Hot Tournament Semifinalist

Mixed martial arts record

|-
| Loss
| align=center| 18-12
| Lee Sang-Soo
| Submission (triangle choke)
| M-1 Challenge 6: Korea
| 
| align=center| 1
| align=center| 4:33
| South Korea
| 
|-
| Win
| align=center| 18-11
| Daniel Tabera
| Decision
| M-1 Challenge 2: Russia
| 
| align=center| 2
| align=center| 5:00
| St. Petersburg, Russia
| 
|-
| Loss
| align=center| 17-11
| Mike Russow
| Submission (north/south choke)
| Yarennoka!
| 
| align=center| 1
| align=center| 2:58
| Saitama, Japan
| 
|-
| Loss
| align=center| 17-10
| Branden Lee Hinkle
| Decision (unanimous)
| BodogFIGHT: Alvarez vs. Lee
| 
| align=center| 3
| align=center| 5:00
| Trenton, New Jersey, United States
| 
|-
| Win
| align=center| 17-9
| Kristof Midoux
| TKO (corner stoppage)
| BodogFIGHT: Clash of the Nations
| 
| align=center| 1
| align=center| 5:00
| St. Petersburg, Russia
| 
|-
| Win
| align=center| 16-9
| Lee Sang-Soo
| Decision (unanimous)
| M-1 MFC: Russia vs. Korea
| 
| align=center| 3
| align=center| 5:00
| N/A
| 
|-
| Win
| align=center| 15-9
| Kristof Midoux
| TKO (punches)
| BodogFIGHT: St. Petersburg
| 
| align=center| 2
| align=center| 4:12
| St. Petersburg, Russia
| 
|-
| Win
| align=center| 14-9
| Lee Min Jin
| Submission (guillotine choke)
| M-1: Mix-Fight Tournament
| 
| align=center| 1
| align=center| 0:55
| Russia
| 
|-
| Win
| align=center| 13-9
| Gilbert Yvel
| KO (punch)
| PRIDE FC: Total Elimination Absolute
| 
| align=center| 1
| align=center| 4:55
| Osaka, Japan
| 2006 PRIDE Openweight Grand Prix Alternate Bout.
|-
| Win
| align=center| 12-9
| Pedro Rizzo
| KO (Punch)
| PRIDE 31: Dreamers
| 
| align=center| 1
| align=center| 0:25
| Saitama, Japan
| 
|-
| Win
| align=center| 11-9
| Ibragim Magomedov
| TKO (punches)
| M-1 MFC: Russia vs. France
| 
| align=center| 2
| align=center| 4:08
| St. Petersburg, Russia
| 
|-
| Loss
| align=center| 10-9
| Fabrício Werdum
| Submission (triangle armbar)
| PRIDE FC: Final Conflict 2005
| 
| align=center| 1
| align=center| 6:01
| Saitama, Japan
| 
|-
| Loss
| align=center| 10-8
| Antoine Jaoude
| TKO (injury)
| Euphoria: Road to the Titles
| 
| align=center| 1
| align=center| 3:33
| Atlantic City, New Jersey, United States
| 
|-
| Loss
| align=center| 10-7
| Travis Wiuff
| TKO (cut)
| Euphoria: Russia vs. USA
| 
| align=center| 2
| align=center| 2:46
| Atlantic City, New Jersey, United States
| 
|-
| Loss
| align=center| 10-6
| Michael Knaap
| KO (punches)
| 2H2H: 2 Hot 2 Handle
| 
| align=center| 1
| align=center| 2:24
| Amsterdam, Netherlands
| 
|-
| Win
| align=center| 10-5
| Bob Schrijber
| Submission (choke)
| M-1 MFC: Russia vs. the World 6
| 
| align=center| 1
| align=center| 2:12
| St. Petersburg, Russia
| Won the M-1 MFC Heavyweight Championship.
|-
| Win
| align=center| 9-5
| Andrey Jangolenko
| TKO (submission to punches)
| M-1 MFC: Russia vs. Ukraine
| 
| align=center| 1
| align=center| 0:16
| St. Petersburg, Russia
| 
|-
| Win
| align=center| 8-5
| Thomas Rahders
| TKO (punches)
| M-1 MFC: Russia vs. the World 5
| 
| align=center| 1
| align=center| 0:20
| St. Petersburg, Russia
| 
|-
| Win
| align=center| 7-5
| Alessio Sakara
| Decision
| M-1 MFC: Russia vs. the World 4
| 
| align=center| 2
| align=center| 5:00
| St. Petersburg, Russia
| 
|-
| Win
| align=center| 6-5
| Michailis Deligiannakis
| KO
| FFG: Heracliones Fight Night
| 
| align=center| 1
| align=center| N/A
| Crete, Greece
| 
|-
| Win
| align=center| 5-5
| Rafael Comes
| TKO (punches)
| M-1 MFC: Russia vs. the World 3
| 
| align=center| 1
| align=center| 3:27
| St. Petersburg, Russia
| 
|-
| Loss
| align=center| 4-5
| Alistair Overeem
| Submission (americana)
| 2H2H 4: Simply the Best
| 
| align=center| 1
| align=center| 1:26
| Rotterdam, Netherlands
| 
|-
| Win
| align=center| 4-4
| Bashir Guliev
| TKO (kick)
| M-1 MFC: Exclusive Fight Night 4
| 
| align=center| 1
| align=center| 3:35
| St. Petersburg, Russia
| 
|-
| Loss
| align=center| 3-4
| Chalid Arrab
| KO
| M-1 MFC: Russia vs. the World 2
| 
| align=center| 1
| align=center| 0:53
| St. Petersburg, Russia
| 
|-
| Loss
| align=center| 3-3
| Moise Rimbon
| Submission (neck crank)
| 2H2H 3: Hotter Than Hot
| 
| align=center| 2
| align=center| N/A
| Rotterdam, Netherlands
| 2H2H 3: Hotter Than Hot Tournament Semifinal.
|-
| Win
| align=center| 3-2
| Dave van der Veen
| TKO (punches)
| 2H2H 3: Hotter Than Hot
| 
| align=center| 1
| align=center| 2:15
| Rotterdam, Netherlands
| 2H2H 3: Hotter Than Hot Tournament Quarterfinal.
|-
| Loss
| align=center| 2-2
| Joop Kasteel
| Submission (shoulder lock)
| MillenniumSports: Veni Vidi Vici
| 
| align=center| N/A
| align=center| N/A
| Veenendaal, Netherlands
| 
|-
| Win
| align=center| 2-1
| Herman van Tol
| KO (head kick)
| M-1 MFC - World Championship 2000
| 
| align=center| 1
| align=center| 0:10
| St. Petersburg, Russia
| 2000 M-1 MFC World Championship Tournament Semifinal.
 
|-
| Loss
| align=center| 1-1
| Andrei Arlovski
| TKO (punches)
| M-1 MFC - European Championship 2000
| 
| align=center| 1
| align=center| 1:18
| St. Petersburg, Russia
| 2000 M-1 MFC European Championship Tournament Final. 
|-
| Win
| align=center| 1-0
| Gennadiy Matsigora
| Submission (guillotine choke)
| M-1 MFC - European Championship 2000
| 
| align=center| 1
| align=center| 1:56
| St. Petersburg, Russia
| 2000 M-1 MFC European Championship Tournament Semifinal.

Professional boxing record

| align="center" style="background: #f0f0f0"|Date
| align="center" style="background: #f0f0f0"|Outcome
| align="center" style="background: #f0f0f0"|Record
| align="center" style="background: #f0f0f0"|Opponent
| align="center" style="background: #f0f0f0"|Event
| align="center" style="background: #f0f0f0"|Method
| align="center" style="background: #f0f0f0"|Round
| align="center" style="background: #f0f0f0"|Notes
|-
|10 Feb 2005
|W
|2-1
| Konstantin Iganskly
|Kentaur Club, Moscow, Russian Federation
|TKO
|3
|
|-
|16 Jul 2003
|W
|1-1
| Sergei Tretiakov
|Conti Casino, St. Petersburg, Russian Federation
|TKO
|3
|
|-
|24 Jul 2002
|L
|0-1
| Sergey Dychkov
|TBC, Vitebsk, Belarus
|KO
|3
|
|-

See also 
List of male mixed martial artists

References

External links 
Roman Zentsov's profile on www.m1mixfight.com.

Boxing Record
PRIDE profile (in English)
PRIDE profile (in Japanese)

Living people
1973 births
Russian male mixed martial artists
Heavyweight mixed martial artists
Heavyweight boxers
Russian Muay Thai practitioners
Russian sambo practitioners
Sportspeople from Bryansk
Russian male boxers
Mixed martial artists utilizing sambo
Mixed martial artists utilizing boxing
Mixed martial artists utilizing Muay Thai